Swan Falls Dam is a concrete gravity type hydroelectric dam in the western United States, on the Snake River in southwestern Idaho.

Built  in 1901 to generate power, Swan Falls is the oldest hydroelectric dam on the Snake River. In the 1990s, the original power plant was replaced. The dam was built with fish passage facilities, but they proved to be very poor in performance. For this reason, among others, the C. J. Strike Dam, built upriver from Swan Falls in the early 1950s, was not equipped with fish passage facilities. Thus, the two dams combined to become the first artificial barrier to anadromous fish migration up the Snake River. Today, Hells Canyon Dam (1967) is the first total barrier to fish migration on the Snake.

Swan Falls Dam and its reservoir lie within the Snake River Birds of Prey National Conservation Area; the dam and power plant were listed in the National Register of Historic Places in 1976.

See also

List of dams in the Columbia River watershed

References

Further reading

Swan Falls Dam
Snake River Hydroelectric Plants
Historic American Engineering Record (HAER) documentation, filed under Snake River, Kuna, Owyhee County, ID:

Dams in Idaho
Dams on the Snake River
Buildings and structures in Ada County, Idaho
Buildings and structures in Owyhee County, Idaho
Hydroelectric power plants in Idaho
Idaho Power dams
Dams completed in 1901
Dams on the National Register of Historic Places in Idaho
Industrial buildings and structures on the National Register of Historic Places in Idaho
Energy infrastructure completed in 1901
Historic American Engineering Record in Idaho
National Register of Historic Places in Ada County, Idaho
National Register of Historic Places in Owyhee County, Idaho
1901 establishments in Idaho